Macarius I may refer to:

 Macarius I of Antioch, patriarch from 656 to 681
 Pope Macarius I of Alexandria, ruled in 932–952
 Makarios I of Cyprus, archbishop of Cyprus from 1854 until 1865
 Macarius Bulgakov, Metropolitan of Moscow and Kolomna in 1879–1882